Sir William Vavasour (1514–1566), of Hazlewood, Yorkshire was an English politician.

He was the son of John Vavasour of Hazlewood Castle, Aberford, Yorkshire and his wife Brianna , daughter of Henry Scrope, 6th Baron Scrope of Bolton and succeeded his father in 1524. He was knighted in 1544.

He was a Justice of the Peace for the West Riding of Yorkshire from 1542 and for the East Riding from 1561 and High Sheriff of Yorkshire for 1548–49 and 1563–64. He was a member of the Council of the North from 1553 to his death.
 
He was elected a Member of Parliament (MP) for Yorkshire in October 1553 (until 1554).

He died in 1566. He had married Elizabeth, the daughter of Anthony Calverley, with whom he had at least six sons and five daughters.

From another source, he was the son of William (5th Baron) Vavasour who was bn. around 1490 and Margaret Welch who was bn. in 1498. Margret was the daughter of Elizabeth Scrope and Walter Welch. William was the son of Henry William Vavasour.

He married Elizabeth Calverley and they had one known daughter (Frances Vavasour) who married Henry Slingsby (bn. 1560).

Their daughter Lady Eleanor Slingsby, married Arthur Ingraham or Ingram Sir Controller of The Customs of The Port of London (who was the something grandson of Arthur Ingram).

References

1514 births
1566 deaths
People from Craven District
English knights
English MPs 1553 (Mary I)
High Sheriffs of Yorkshire
William